The First and Last is a live album released by the "once-only" supergroup band New Race. The First and Last is a collection of recordings from the various shows the band played along the East Coast of Australia in 1981. New Race contained members of the band Radio Birdman: Deniz Tek, Rob Younger, and Warwick Gilbert, along with guitarist from The Stooges- Ron Asheton, and MC5 drummer Dennis Thompson. The First and Last is often hailed as one of the greatest live Punk rock albums of all time, though there is a dispute as to the true genre of the album. Radio Birdman are often regarded as one of the integral influences of Australian punk rock, but their style and sound is often compared to that of the MC5 Detroit sound, and the broad genre of Proto-punk, which includes bands such as The Stooges, The Velvet Underground, and The New York Dolls.

While the band was recorded live, Rob Younger's lead vocal track was re-recorded in the studio before release. Several bootleg recordings of the tour on French record label Revenge show that there were no obvious issues with Younger's voice, however the original recordings with Younger's live vocal from the tour have never been released.

Track listing 
"Crying Sun"
"Haunted Road"
"Sad T.V."
"Breaks My Heart"
"Looking at You"
"November 22, 1963"
"Alone in the Endzone"
"Love Kills"
"Gotta Keep Movin'"
"Columbia"

Personnel
New Race
Ron Asheton - Guitar
Warwick Gilbert - Bass
Deniz Tek - Guitar, backing vocals
Dennis Thompson - drums, backing vocals
Rob Younger - lead vocals
with:
Chris Masuak - Third Guitar on "Columbia" and "Looking at You"
Clyde Bramley - Studio-dubbed in backing vocals on "Crying Sun", "Haunted Road" and "Columbia"

References

External links
http://www.sdv.fr/pages/dgieff/b_newrac.htm
http://perso.orange.fr/birdmanpage/newrace.htm

1982 live albums
New Race albums